Phantom Bride is a remix EP by Erasure. It was released by Mute Records on CD and download  to commemorate the release of the 21st anniversary edition of The Innocents.

The EP features new remixes of tracks from The Innocents album.

Track listing 

2009 EPs
Erasure albums
Mute Records EPs